Doomsword is the self-titled debut album by Italian heavy metal band Doomsword, released in 1999. A number of its tracks reference fantasy literature, such as The Lord of the Rings, and Michael Moorcock's Elric Saga. "Nadsokor" in particular is a reference to the latter. It is also a Cirith Ungol cover.

Track listing
"Sacred Metal" – 6:16
"Warbringers" – 6:33
"Helms Deep" – 7:17
"One Eyed God" – 4:37
"Return to Imrryr" – 5:06
"Nadsokor" – 4:50
"Swords of Doom" – 6:34
"On the March" – 6:13

References

External links 
 https://www.sputnikmusic.com/review/29754/Doomsword-Doomsword/

1999 debut albums
Doomsword albums